Jón Arnór Stefánsson (born 21 September 1982) is an Icelandic basketball player and a former member of the Icelandic national team. One of Iceland's most successful athletes of the early 21st century, he was the Icelandic Sportsperson of the Year in 2014 and was a 12-time Icelandic Male Basketball Player of the Year. A three time Úrvalsdeild Domestic Player of the Year, he won the Icelandic championship five times and the FIBA Europe League once. He spent most of his career in Spain, Italy and Iceland, winning the Italian Basketball Cup in 2006 and the Icelandic Cup in 2017.

High school career
Jón Arnór attended Artesia High School in Lakewood, California from 1999 to 2000. His stay was cut short when allegations rose that he and teammate Jack Michael Martínez had been illegally recruited by coach Wayne Merino. In the end Artesia's basketball program was stripped of two championships and Merino, Artesia's coach for thirteen seasons, was fired. Jón returned to KR in time for the 2000 Úrvalsdeild karla playoffs and helped the club win the national championship.

Professional career
He won the FIBA EuroCup title in 2005 with BC Dynamo Saint Petersburg. He was a member of the NBA's Dallas Mavericks from 2003 to 2004, but he spent the whole season on the injury list and never played a regular season or playoff game with them.

On 30 April 2017 Jón Arnór won the Icelandic championship for the third time with KR and was named the 2017 playoffs MVP. On 28 April 2018 Jón Arnór won his fourth Icelandic championship after KR defeated Tindastóll in the Úrvalsdeild finals. In November 2018, Jón Arnór announced that he would retire after the 2018-2019 season.

On 4 May 2019 Jón Arnór won his 5th national championship after KR beat ÍR in the Úrvalsdeild finals 3-2.

In August 2020, Jón Arnór signed with KR Reykjavík rivals Valur.

He announced his retirement from professional basketball following Valur's 2-3 loss against KR in the first round of the Úrvalsdeild playoffs.

In January 2022, Jón Arnór returned to the floor with KR-b in the Icelandic third-tier 2. deild karla.

National team career
Jón Arnór played 100 games for the Icelandic men's national basketball team from 2000 to 2019, appearing in EuroBasket 2015 and EuroBasket 2017. He retired after Iceland's 91-67 victory against Portugal on 21 February 2019, where he led all scorers with 17 points.

Career statistics

Euroleague

|-
| style="text-align:left;"| 2006–07
| style="text-align:left;"| Lottomatica
| 6 || 0 || 18.2 || .359 || .133 || .800 || 1.8 || .8 || 1.0 || .0 || 6.3 || 2.8
|-
| style="text-align:left;"| 2007–08
| style="text-align:left;"| Lottomatica
| 15 || 5 || 25.5 || .386 || .311 || .796 || 2.3 || 1.3 || 1.1 || .0 || 10.0 || 7.7
|-
| style="text-align:left;"| 2014–15
| style="text-align:left;"| Unicaja
| 20 || 3 || 13.1 || .396 || .286 || .600 || .6 || 1.2 || .2 || .0 || 5.1 || 1.6
|- class="sortbottom"
| style="text-align:left;"| Career
| style="text-align:left;"|
| 41 || 8 || 18.4 || .386 || .280 || .750 || 1.4 || 1.2 || .6 || .0 || 7.1 || 4.0

Awards and accomplishments

Club honours
FIBA Europe League:2004–05
Italian Basketball Cup: 2006
Icelandic championship: 2000, 2009, 2017, 2018, 2019
Icelandic Basketball Cup: 2017
Icelandic Company Cup: 2008

Individual awards
Icelandic Sportsperson of the Year : 2014
Icelandic Basketball Player of the Year : 2002-2005, 2007-2010, 2012–2015
Úrvalsdeild Domestic Player of the Year : 2002, 2009, 2017
Úrvalsdeild Domestic All-First Team : 2001, 2002, 2009, 2017
Úrvalsdeild Men's Playoffs MVP (2) : 2009, 2017
Icelandic Cup MVP: 2017
FIBA EuroCup All-Star Day : (2005)

Personal life
Jón Arnór was born in Skövde, Sweden, to Icelandic parents. He is the brother of handballer and Olympic silver medalist Ólafur Stefánsson and former footballer Eggert Stefánsson who played with Fram in Úrvalsdeild karla.

References

External links
Jón Stefánsson at acb.com
Jón Stefánsson at eurobasket.com
Jón Stefánsson at euroleague.net
Jón Stefánsson at kki.is
Jón Stefánsson at legabasket.it

1982 births
Living people
Baloncesto Málaga players
Basket Napoli players
Basket Zaragoza players
BC Dynamo Saint Petersburg players
CB Granada players
Jón Arnór Stefánsson
Jón Arnór Stefánsson
Jón Arnór Stefánsson
Jón Arnór Stefánsson
Jón Arnór Stefánsson
Jón Arnór Stefánsson
Jón Arnór Stefánsson
Icelandic people of Swedish descent
Jón Arnór Stefánsson
Lega Basket Serie A players
Liga ACB players
Pallacanestro Treviso players
Pallacanestro Virtus Roma players
Shooting guards
Small forwards
Jón Arnór Stefánsson
Swedish men's basketball players
Jón Arnór Stefánsson
Valencia Basket players
Jón Arnór Stefánsson
People from Skövde Municipality
Sportspeople from Västra Götaland County